José Caraballo may refer to:

 José Caraballo (painter) (1930–1992), Puerto Rican painter
 José Caraballo (footballer) (born 1996), Venezuelan footballer